William Patrick Gannon (March 17, 1873 – April 26, 1927) was a right fielder in Major League Baseball. He committed suicide in Fort Worth, Texas.

Major League career
Gannon made his debut on September 9, 1901, at age 28. He appeared in 15 games. He collected a mere 9 hits in 61 at-bats, scored 2 runs, and drew a base on balls once. He hit no home runs. He had a batting average of .148 and a fielding percentage of 1.000.

References

Sources

1873 births
1927 suicides
Baseball players from New Haven, Connecticut
Major League Baseball outfielders
Chicago Cubs players
Suicides by drowning in the United States
Suicides in Texas
Hartford Bluebirds players
New Haven Texas Steers players
Canandaigua Giants players
Cortland Wagonmakers players
Binghamton Bingoes players
Ilion Typewriters players
Waverly Wagonmakers players
Kansas City Blues (baseball) players
Louisville Colonels (minor league) players
Memphis Egyptians players
Altoona Mountaineers players
Albany Senators players
Los Angeles Angels (minor league) players
Los Angeles (minor league baseball) players